Myles Patrick (born November 19, 1954 in Macon, Georgia) is an American former professional basketball player.

A 6'8" forward from Auburn University, Patrick played one season (1980–81) in the NBA for the Los Angeles Lakers. He averaged 1.7 points per game. He has recently worked as a midnight basketball coordinator in his hometown of Macon.

Basketball career
As a four-year letterman at Auburn University, Patrick wound up his collegiate career ranked sixth in Auburn's all-time rebounding standings and 14th in the scoring list. Patrick averaged 8.3 points and 6.5 rebounds in 105 total games for Auburn. Aside from seeing action with the Los Angeles Lakers in 1980-81, he performed with the Montana Sky in the defunct Western Basketball Association and the Maine Lumberjacks in the Continental Basketball Association. Patrick averaged 15 points and six rebounds for the Lakers' entry in the Southern California Summer Pro League in 1980 before suffering a fractured jaw.

Notes

1954 births
Living people
American men's basketball players
Auburn Tigers men's basketball players
Basketball players from Georgia (U.S. state)
Los Angeles Lakers players
Maine Lumberjacks players
Parade High School All-Americans (boys' basketball)
Small forwards
Sportspeople from Macon, Georgia
Undrafted National Basketball Association players
American expatriate basketball people in the Philippines
Philippine Basketball Association imports
Great Taste Coffee Makers players